Batupan Bogue is a stream in the U.S. state of Mississippi. It is a tributary to the Yalobusha River. It has an average discharge of 409 cubic feet per second near Grenada, MS.

Name
Batupan Bogue is a name derived from the Choctaw language.

Its many variant names include:
Bataupan River Bogue
Batawpan Bogue
Batupan Bogue Creek
Batupan River
Batupon Bogue
Beacapon Bogue Creek
Big Bogue Creek
Bogue Creek
Worsham Creek

References

Rivers of Mississippi
Rivers of Grenada County, Mississippi
Mississippi placenames of Native American origin